European lyctus beetle (Lyctus linearis) is a species of beetle in the family Bostrichidae. It is a member of the subfamily Lyctinae, the powderpost beetles. It was originally native to tropical regions, but it can now be found worldwide. It is a common pest of wood and wood products and it is transported around the world with them. It is most common in deciduous tree woods.

References

Bostrichidae
Woodboring beetles
Beetles described in 1877